Faande Poriya Boga Kaande Re is a 2011 Bengali-language Indian romantic comedy film, directed by Soumik Chattopadhyay, starring Soham Chakraborty and Srabanti Chatterjee. The film is a remake of the 2010 Telugu film Maryada Ramanna.

Plot 
Mishti falls in love with Raju, a simple man who must defend himself against Mishti's father and brothers who are all out for revenge because Raju's father killed Mishti's uncle before her father killed Raju's father.

Cast

Crew

Soundtrack

References

External links
 Faande Poriya Boga Kaande Re at the Gomolo

2011 films
Bengali-language Indian films
2010s Bengali-language films
2011 romantic comedy films
Bengali remakes of Telugu films
Indian romantic comedy films